N4-(beta-N-acetylglucosaminyl)-L-asparaginase (aspartylglucosylamine deaspartylase, aspartylglucosylaminase, aspartylglucosaminidase, aspartylglycosylamine amidohydrolase, N-aspartyl-beta-glucosaminidase, glucosylamidase, beta-aspartylglucosylamine amidohydrolase, 4-N-(beta-N-acetyl-D-glucosaminyl)-L-asparagine amidohydrolase) is an enzyme with systematic name N4-(beta-N-acetyl-D-glucosaminyl)-L-asparagine amidohydrolase. This enzyme catalyses the following chemical reaction

 N4-(beta-N-acetyl-D-glucosaminyl)-L-asparagine + H2O  N-acetyl-beta-D-glucosaminylamine + L-aspartate

This enzyme acts only on asparagine-oligosaccharides containing one amino acid.

See also 
 Aspartylglucosaminidase

References

External links 
 

EC 3.5.1